Borisov Government may refer to:
First Borisov Government (2009–2013)
Second Borisov Government (2014–2017)
Third Borisov Government (2017-2021)